Christopher T. Hanson is an American bureaucrat and the current chairman of the United States Nuclear Regulatory Commission (NRC).

He was sworn as a NRC Commissioner on June 8, 2020, and was reaffirmed by President Biden. He was previously a staff member on the Senate Appropriations Committee, as well as a Department of Energy official.

Previously he was a consultant at Booz Allen Hamilton, where he led energy projects for government and industry.

President Biden designated Hanson as chairman of the NRC effective January 20, 2021.

He has a master's from Yale Divinity School and Yale School of Forestry and Environmental Studies, and a Bachelor of Arts degree in Religious Studies from Valparaiso University.

References

Nuclear Regulatory Commission officials
Living people
Year of birth missing (living people)
Place of birth missing (living people)
Yale School of Forestry & Environmental Studies alumni
Valparaiso University alumni